Hierodoris insignis is a species of moth in the family Gelechiidae.  It is endemic to New Zealand and has been found in the Nelson/Tasman districts. The larvae are leaf miners and are hosted by Celmisia species. Adults are on the wing in January. It is likely that this species belongs to another genus and as such this species is also known as Hierodoris (s.l.) insignis or 'Hierodoris' insignis.

 Taxonomy 
This species was first described by Alfred Philpott in 1926 under the name Hierodoris ? insignis. He placed the species within the genus Hierodoris provisionally but stated that further material was needed to fix the genus with certainty. In 1988 J. S. Dugdale placed this species within the family Gelechiidae. In 2005 Robert Hoare commented that H. insignis is completely unrelated to the genus it is currently placed in, that is Hierodoris. As a result of this disputed placement this species is also known as Hierodoris (s.l.) insignis or  'Hierodoris' insignis. The male holotype specimen, collected by S. Lindsay at an altitude of 4000 ft on the Mount Arthur tableland, is held in the Canterbury Museum.

Description 
Philpott described this species as follows:

Distribution 

This species is endemic to New Zealand and is found in the Nelson/Tasman districts.

Behaviour 
The adults of this species are on the wing in January.

Habitat and hosts 
The larvae of this species is a leaf miner. It mines the tomentum underneath the leaves of Celmisia species.

References 

Oecophoridae
Moths described in 1926
Moths of New Zealand
Endemic fauna of New Zealand
Taxa named by Alfred Philpott
Endemic moths of New Zealand